A calathus  or kalathos  (plural calathi or kalathoi ) was a basket in the form of a top hat, used to hold wool or fruit, often used in ancient Greek art as a symbol of abundance and fertility. These baskets were made by weaving together reeds or twigs. They were typically used by women to store skeins of wool, but they had other uses in the household.  In Roman times, there are reports for baskets of these sorts to be used in agricultural activities like bringing in the fruits from the fields.

The word was also used to describe ceramic vases designed in the shape of the calathus basket, which is the usual application in archaeology, since vases have survived while baskets have not.

The calathus usually had a narrow base and a flared top. The decoration on some of the ceramic calathi is taken to imitate the woven texture of a basket. This can be achieved by a painted design, but many calathi have open-work cut into their sides  and some have impressed decoration. Calathi may occur with or without handles. In both the Greek and Roman worlds these baskets had many uses, but were especially associated with wool working and the harvest.

The calathus is principally a multifunctional basket. Literary sources report that, depending on the context, the calathus could contain wool, but also food (bread, cheese, milk, fruits and vegetables), small animals or flowers. The calathi were most often made of willow rods, but other examples made from clay, metal, glass and stone are also known. A silver calathus with a golden rim is mentioned by Homer as belonging to Helen, this one even ran on wheels. Calathi are also depicted on Greek vases in other contexts. Illustrations on south-Italian vases make use of the calathus as a symbol of a future marital relationship.

In Cyprus, a fragmentary figurine of a woman wearing a crown (polos in the shape of a calathus) has been identified as Aphrodite. Similar crowned limestone heads have been found all over the island. The calathus has traditionally been interpreted as a fertility symbol, reserved for goddesses or their priestesses.

See also
 Cornucopia

References

External links

 Kalathos from Kalymnos 1130BC-1090BC, British Museum
 Kalathos :  The Collaborative Numismatics Project
 Mycenaen Ceramic Kalathos, Phoenix Ancient Art

Ancient Greek pot shapes
Basket weaving
Containers
Fertility
Greek culture